French Kiss is a 12-metre class yacht that competed in the 1987 Louis Vuitton Cup.

References

12-metre class yachts
Sailing yachts of France
Louis Vuitton Cup yachts